Tanel Sokk (born 20 January 1985) is an Estonian professional basketball player who plays for TalTech Basketball Team of the Latvian–Estonian Basketball League. Standing at 1.88 m (6 ft 2 in), he plays at the point guard position. He also represents the Estonian national basketball team internationally.

Professional career
Sokk began playing basketball in his father's, Tiit Sokk's, basketball school. He began his professional career in 2002 with Nybit of the Korvpalli Meistriliiga, coached by his father. On his first season in the KML, Sokk averaged 13.12 points per game and won the KML Best Young Player Award.

Dalkia/Nybit finished the 2005–06 season in third place. Sokk averaged 14.22 points per game and was named to the All-KML Team.

In 2006, Sokk signed for Kalev/Cramo. He won his first Estonian Championship in the 2008–09 season, when Kalev/Cramo defeated TÜ/Rock 4 games to 2 in the KML Finals. From 2011 to 2014, Sokk won four consecutive Estonian Championships with Kalev/Cramo. In 2012 and 2013, he won the KML Finals Most Valuable Player Award and was named to the All-KML Team.

Sokk joined TÜ/Rock for the 2014–15 season but had to postpone his debut for the team until 17 October 2014 due to an injury. He won his sixth Estonian Championship, after TÜ/Rock defeated his former team Kalev/Cramo in the KML Finals, winning the series 4 games to 1.

Estonian national team
As a member of the senior Estonian national basketball team, Sokk competed at the EuroBasket 2015, averaging 1 point and 0.5 rebounds per game, in 8.5 minutes. Estonia finished the tournament in 20th place.

Personal life
Sokk's father, Tiit Sokk, is a basketball coach and a retired professional basketball player who won a gold medal in the 1988 Summer Olympics with the Soviet Union national basketball team. His younger brother, Sten, is also a professional basketball player and represents the Estonian national basketball team internationally.

Awards and accomplishments

Professional career
Kalev/Cramo
 6× Estonian League champion: 2009, 2011, 2012, 2013, 2014, 2019
 3× Estonian Cup champion: 2006, 2007, 2008

University of Tartu
 Estonian League champion: 2015
 Estonian Cup champion: 2014

Individual
 2× KML Finals Most Valuable Player Award: 2012, 2013
 KML Best Young Player Award: 2003
 3× All-KML Team: 2006, 2012, 2013
 VTB United League Top Estonian Player: 2013

References

External links
 Tanel Sokk at basket.ee 
 Tanel Sokk at fiba.com

1985 births
Living people
Basketball players from Tallinn
Estonian men's basketball players
Point guards
Korvpalli Meistriliiga players
BC Kalev/Cramo players
Tartu Ülikool/Rock players